The Fujitsu Celsius is a line of laptop and workstation computers manufactured by Fujitsu. The brand name has also been used for graphic accelerators. 

The laptops have Intel Core vPro, i5, or i7 processors, while the workstations have one or two Intel Xeon processors.

History and usage 
The computers are intended for applications such as computer-aided design, digital content creation, geographical information systems work, architecture, engineering, financial forecasting, flux balance analysis, scientific simulation, electronic design, and virtual reality.

Fujitsu Celsius equipment was used to stitch together thousands of individual photographic images to create large-scale 360-degree panoramic images: an 80-gigapixel image of London was published in November 2010, stating: “using this excellent workstation allowed this record-breaking photo to be created a few weeks faster than would have been possible on any other available PC.” The 320-gigapixel photomosaic of London published in February 2013 was prepared on a Celsius R920 in three months' time.

Models

Desktops 
Celsius R630 specs

Celsius R920  - 2012's model; The R920 is able to accept up to 512 GB of RAM.

Laptops 
Celsius H710 and Celsius H910 - 2011's models.

TFTS, “Fujitsu Brings Out Pair Of New Laptops, The Celsius H710 And The Celsius H910 [Described As Workstation Laptops, Fujitsu's New Hardware Offers Variety Of Configurations And High Power]”, Steve Anderson, May 23, 2011 http://nexus404.com/Blog/2011/05/23/fujitsu-brings-pair-laptops-celsius/

See also
 Fujitsu Primergy servers and Fujitsu Esprimo desktops
 Dell Precision
 Lenovo ThinkStation
 Mac Pro
 HP Z

References

Mobile workstations
Fujitsu computers
Fujitsu laptops